Tropine acyltransferase (tropine:acyl-CoA transferase, acetyl-CoA:tropan-3-ol acyltransferase, tropine acetyltransferase, tropine tigloyltransferase, TAT) is an enzyme with systematic name acyl-CoA:tropine O-acyltransferase. This enzyme catalyses the following chemical reaction

 acyl-CoA + tropine  CoA + O-acyltropine

This enzyme exhibits absolute specificity for the endo/3alpha configuration found in tropine as pseudotropine.

References

External links 
 

EC 2.3.1